In mathematics, in particular, in algebraic geometry, an isogeny is a morphism of algebraic groups (also known as group varieties) that is surjective and has a finite kernel.

If the groups are abelian varieties, then any morphism  of the underlying algebraic varieties which is surjective with finite fibres is automatically an isogeny, provided that .

The terms "isogeny" and "isogenous" come from the Greek word ισογενη-ς, meaning "equal in kind or nature". The term "isogeny" was introduced by Weil; before this, the term "isomorphism" was somewhat confusingly used for what is now called an isogeny.

Case of abelian varieties

For abelian varieties, such as elliptic curves, this notion can also be formulated as follows:

Let E1 and E2 be abelian varieties of the same dimension over a field k. An isogeny between E1 and E2 is a dense morphism  of varieties that preserves basepoints (i.e. f maps the identity point on E1 to that on E2).

This is equivalent to the above notion, as every dense morphism between two abelian varieties of the same dimension is automatically surjective with finite fibres, and if it preserves identities then it is a homomorphism of groups.

Two abelian varieties E1 and E2 are called isogenous if there is an isogeny . This can be shown to be an equivalence relation; in the case of elliptic curves, symmetry is due to the existence of the dual isogeny. As above, every isogeny induces homomorphisms of the groups of the k-valued points of the abelian varieties.

See also
 Abelian varieties up to isogeny
 Selmer group

References
 
 

Morphisms of schemes